Uckermark War was a military conflict fought in Uckermark, Brandenburg, between 1425 and 2 May 1427. It was fought by Pomerania-Stettin, Pomerania-Wolgast, Pomerania-Stolp, Pomerania-Stargard, Mecklenburg-Stargard, Crown of the Kingdom of Poland, and Werle, attacking the Margraviate of Brandenburg.

History 
At the beginning of 1425, armies of Pomerania-Stettin led by Otto II and Casimir V, Pomerania-Wolgast led by Wartislaw IX, Pomerania-Stolp and Pomerania-Stargard led by Bogislav IX, and Mecklenburg-Stargard led by Henry, and forces of Greater Poland nobility from the Crown of the Kingdom of Poland, led by Jan of Czarnków under Stettin command, had invaded Uckermark in Margraviate of Brandenburg, that was ruled by Frederick I. The attacking army had the approval of Sigismund, the Holy Roman Emperor. On 15 February 1425, the invading armies had captured the town of Prenzlau. In the response, Frederick I had attacked with his army, alongside the Oder river, and besieging the castle in Vierraden, where he eventually got defeated by Polish and Pomeranian forces.

On 1 May 1425, the invading states had signed an anty-Branderburgish alliance in Demmin with Christopher and William, co-rulers of Werle. In February 1326, Frederick had traveled to Franconia, where he had organized the mercenary forces. At the same time, his son, John, on 25 August 1425, had led his army in a victorious battle of Pritzwalk, during which Christopher of Werle had died. On 23 August 1426, John and recaptured the town of Prenzlau, and on 12 October 1426, he had signed a peace treaty with William of Werle. On 22 May 1427, both sides had signed a peace treaty in Eberswalde, ending the war. In the treaty, Pomerania-Stettin was given a few neighboring towns.

Citations

Notes

References

Bibliography 
 Edward Rymar, Wojny i spory pomorsko-brandenburskie w XV-XVI w, Wyd. Inforteditions, Zabrze, 2012.
 J.W. Szymański, Książęcy ród Gryfitów, Goleniów–Kielce, 2006, ISBN 83-7273-224-8.

Wars of the Middle Ages
Wars involving Poland
Wars involving Brandenburg
History of Brandenburg
History of Pomerania
History of Greater Poland
Conflicts in 1425
Conflicts in 1426
Conflicts in 1427
15th century in Europe
15th century in the Holy Roman Empire